is a Ryukyuan gusuku in Kumejima, Okinawa, on Kume Island. It was the home to the Aji of Kume Magiri before the 16th century. It is now a ruined castle.

References

External links
A youtube video

Castles in Okinawa Prefecture
Kumejima, Okinawa